Concord High School is a 9-12 public high school in Concord, California, United States,. It is one of the six high schools in the Mount Diablo Unified School District. Concord High School was constructed in 1966 and currently provides  in permanent structure, including about 70 classrooms, a library, and other structures. As of 2022, the current principal is Julene MacKinnon.

Athletics

Fall
Cross country
Football
Golf (girls)
Marching band
Tennis (girls)
Volleyball (girls)
Water polo
Auxiliaries
Cheerleading

Winter
Basketball
Soccer
Winter percussion
Winterguard
Wrestling

Spring
Baseball
Bowling
Golf (boys)
Softball
Swimming
Tennis (boys)
Track & field
Volleyball (boys)
Auxiliaries (training clinics)

Field of Dreams
The vision of the Field of Dreams Project is to renovate existing, build new, and maintain facilities that will benefit all indoor and outdoor athletic programs and fine arts programs. Field of Dreams led the way for:

The new Concord High football stadium.  Opened in autumn 2006, the new stadium features new lights, grass, scoreboard, bigger and better bleachers, fencing, goal posts, and renovations and building of stadium bleachers.  The Homecoming game of 2006 was the first ever game in the history of Concord High to be played on Concord's own field under its own lights.
Over the summer of 2006, many improvements were made to the Concord High gymnasium, including new flooring with artwork and new lighting.
Concord received new tennis courts as a result of a $500,000 project funded by Measure A and Proposition 55. They are currently in use.
Baseball field improvements, including scoreboard, fencing, wind screen, and many more improvements are being planned.
 Renovated softball field with new scoreboard, fencing, etc.

Minutemen football program
The Minutemen football program is led by Head Coach Bywater.

On December 11, 2010, the Concord High football team won its first North Coast Section Division II Championship by defeating Rancho Cotate High School (Rohnert Park, California) 40-37 in the Oakland Coliseum. The Minutemen finished 13-1. The 2010 offense averaged 50.6 points per game (third in California) and scored a total of 100 touchdowns.

The following year, the Minutemen again appeared in the NCS Division II title game but fell to Windsor High School (Windsor, California) 28-20 on December 9, 2011 at Santa Rosa High School. The Minutemen finished with a 10-3 overall record.

Concord High had previously been to the NCS 2A Championship game in 1989, where they were defeated by Marin Catholic High School.

The 2012 team finished 10-3 after falling to Clayton Valley Charter 49-22 on November 23 in the NCS Division II Semifinals.

Minutemen soccer program
The Concord High School has an active soccer program. The women's program made it two consecutive years to the North Coast Sections finals in 2005 (defeated by Bishop O'Dowd High School) and 2006 (defeated by Campolindo High School). In the 2008 season, the team made it to the NCS playoffs  but were eliminated by Las Lomas High School in the quarterfinals.

Minutemen swimming program
The 1977 and 1978 men's teams won the North Coast Section Championship.

The 1978 boys' swim team finished with a third ranking in the United States.

The 1985 Women's team won the North Coast Section Championship

Former All Americans include Dan Boatwright, Dave Boatwright, John Riolo, Jerry Ferris, Rich Taylor, Dan Brady, Paul Donohue, Dan Akre, Duane Fiene, Paul Vanhoven, Greg Witters, Rich Newton, Steve Larocque, Sean Harrison, Kevin Leveroni, Jim Taylor, Raphael Brasil, Brett Lowe, Robin Fiene, Lindsay Ingles, Dori Green, Jean Collins, Julie Jordan, and Ali Rowe. Paul Vanhoven, Dori Green, and Steve Larocque were also national age group record holders.

Concord high cheerleading
2016-2017 Varsity cheerleaders won a national championship in Las Vegas Feb 17 2017.

2017-2018 Varsity cheerleaders won their second National championship in Las Vegas on February 24, 2018.

Concord High softball
Lead by Coach Megan Coddington, the Minutemen Softball team has won four NCS Division II Championships since 2010.

Academics

Concord High offers many course choices, including over 18 AP/honors courses.  The school once offered many foreign languages, including Spanish, French, German, and American Sign Language, but due to budget cuts, German and French were discontinued..

The school also features a great band program with six different bands. Ladies First is an advanced women's singing group. Fine arts classes at Concord include Art, Ceramics, Photography, Creative Writing, Film Study, Video Production, Foods, Drama, Concert Choir, Show Choir, Ladies First, Women's Ensemble, Symphonic Band, Orchestra, Stage Band, Jazz Ensemble, Wind Ensemble, and Marching Band.

The journalism class currently does not produce any publication due to a lack of participation in the course. When it did publish, the school newspaper was named The Patriot.

Concord High, in partnership with the Contra Costa County Office of Education and their ROP classes, also has a Robotics class.

CHS Academy
The CHS Academy is a Health and Human Services California Partnership Academy located on the Concord campus and available for 10th, 11th, and 12th grade students. Academy students take their core class with the same classmates for the entire school year, but also take some classes with the general student population. Students in the academy form close relationships with each other and with their teachers throughout their years in the program.

Academy curriculum focuses on preparing students for life after high school with an emphasis on health and human services fields such as medicine, psychology, and social work. Academy students are automatically enrolled in special elective courses to complement the focus of the Academy. Sophomores take Career Transitions, which focuses on exploring interests and various career fields in the health sector. Juniors take Psychology within the academy, and, in addition to regular classes, attend a Career Explorations class at Diablo Valley College in the spring. Seniors take Sociology, with a focus on looking at modern society in regards to a variety of topics, from homelessness and health issues, to dissecting advertisements in the media. Students in the academy attend many field trips throughout the year, including trips to many local colleges such as UC Davis, Berkeley, the Art Academy, and San Francisco State. Students in the academy also organize the yearly Diversity Conference, blood drives, and donation drives.

Drama
The drama department at Concord High is led by Paul Crissey and has greatly improved over the last few years. Notably, it was the very first high school in the country to perform the play Zoot Suit. Different levels of drama classes are offered; however, auditions for the productions put on throughout the year are open to all of the school's students. The drama department does three productions a year.

The most recent fall production, To Kill a Mockingbird, starred Jave Hernandez as Atticus Finch.

Fall productions

The fall production is typically a two-act play performed in the drama room, anytime between November and December. Recent productions have included To Kill a Mockingbird (2014), Alice in Wonderland (2013), The Breakfast Club (2012), Love, Sex, and the I.R.S (2011), Brighton Beach Memoirs (2010), and Animal Farm (2009).

The One-Acts

The One-Acts are a series of four to eight one-act plays that are performed after the school's winter break. These are an opportunity for students to write and/or direct their own play, excluding the purely freshman one-act play directed by Crissey each year.

Spring productions

The spring production is a musical performed in the school's multipurpose room. Recent productions include Guys and Dolls (2015), Fame the Musical (2014), Footloose (2013), Little Shop of Horrors (2012), The 25th Annual Putnam County Spelling Bee (2011), and Guys and Dolls (2010). Since 2011, the musicals have featured a live score, performed by students in the music department.

Music
Concord High Instrumental Music is a program including Concord High's Marching Band, Jazz Ensemble, Wind Ensemble, Orchestra and Stage Band as well as Percussion, Winter Percussion, Auxiliaries and Winter Guard. The marching band has taken part in the Oakland Holiday Parade, the Broadway Parade of lights, and the Hollywood Parade in Pasadena, and have competed in various reviews throughout the area.  The Jazz Ensemble has performed at the Todos Santos tree lighting for several years and performs locally at community events such as the yearly fundraiser A Night of Jazz and Casino Night around March and April.

In 2009, the band program went to the Seattle Music Heritage Festival and took sweepstakes, placing first in the jazz band category and first and second in the wind ensemble categories. The Concord High Instrumental Program has gone on several performing trips to Washington DC, Disneyland and Hawaii.

Notable alumni
 Carlos Alazraqui - voice actor; currently plays Deputy Garcia on Reno 911!
 Dave Barr - professional football player; quarterback for the University of California
 Tom Candiotti - professional baseball player
 Bonnie-Jill Laflin - former NBA and NFL cheerleader; model' actress
 Jon Weisberg - former bassist of the band From First to Last

References

External links 
 

Mount Diablo Unified School District
High schools in Contra Costa County, California
Public high schools in California
Buildings and structures in Concord, California
Educational institutions established in 1966
1966 establishments in California